SSIT may refer to:
S.S. Institute of Technology
 Sri Siddhartha Institute of Technology, Tumkur

Educational institution disambiguation pages

de:SSIT
ko:SSIT
it:SSIT
nl:SSIT
ja:SSIT
fi:SSIT